The Minister responsible for the Status of Women oversees the Status of Women Secretariat under Manitoba's Department of Families.

Since 1982, the Executive Council of Manitoba has included a minister responsible for the Status of Women; however, the position is not a full cabinet portfolio and has always been held by a minister who holds other cabinet responsibilities. The current Minister is Rochelle Squires, who is also the provincial Minister of Families.

Through the Minister, the independent, arm's-length Manitoba Women's Advisory Council (MWAC) advises the Government of Manitoba on matters regarding the status of women.

Status of Women Secretariat 

The Status of Women Secretariat (Manitoba Status of Women, MSW) is responsible for promoting "gender equality and the equal participation of all women in society;" improving "the economic, legal, social and health status of women;" and contributing "to ending exploitation and violence against women." MSW concerns itself with the current status of Manitoba's women in such key areas as education, employment, health, and violence against women, as well as providing the public with information on how women are fairing in such areas.

History 
In 1972, the Women's Bureau was created within Manitoba's Department of Labour in order to provide information and assistance to working women or those planning to enter the labour force. In 1984, the Bureau was restructured, renamed Manitoba Women's Directorate, and tasked with supporting the Minister responsible for the Status of Women. The Directorate would work to influence government decision-making to facilitate the integration of women's concerns in public policy and legislation; conducted research and policy analysis of women's issues, as well as raising awareness for such; worked with government departments and community members to promote measures meant to help women achieve equality; and generated government initiatives that reflected priorities of Manitoba women.

Between 2008 and 2009, employees of the Women's Directorate were consolidated with those of the Manitoba Women's Advisory Council (MWAC) as part of the Manitoba Status of Women Division. Whereas MWAC would continue working as a distinct entity, the Women's Directorate was subsumed within the new division.

In 2012, the Directorate, along with the Women's Advisory Council, came under the jurisdiction of the newly-formed Department of Family Services and Labour.

Manitoba Women's Advisory Council 
The Manitoba Women's Advisory Council (MWAC) is an independent, arm's-length organization that advises the Government of Manitoba on matters regarding the status of women, through the Minister responsible for the status of women. The Council consists of a chairperson and up to 18 members, all appointed by Lieutenant-Governor-in Council. Barbara Bowes is the current chairperson of the Council.

In 1980, the Manitoba Women's Advisory Council on the Status of Women was established by the provincial government by Order-in-Council. The Council's permanence as an independent, arms-length advisory body would be ensured through the passing of the Manitoba Advisory Council on the Status of Women's Act was passed in 1987. The Council's name was changed to its current title in 1992 with the passage of the Manitoba Women's Advisory Council Act.

In 2004, the Council was placed under the Department of Labour's purview while maintaining its arm's-length role. Between 2008 and 2009, the staff of the Women's Directorate were integrated with the staff of the Council as part of the Manitoba Status of Women Division, however the Manitoba Women's Advisory Council continues to operate as a distinct entity.

In 2012, the Council, along with the Status of Women Directorate, came under the wing of the newly-formed Department of Family Services and Labour. The following year, with the Department of Family Services and Labour was yet again separating into individual departments, the Women's Advisory Council was placed under the jurisdiction of Family Services.

List of Ministers responsible for the Status of Women

References

Status of Women, Minister responsible for the
Women in Manitoba